The Sports Lifetime Achievement Award is a special award given away each year at the Sports Emmy Awards. It was first given away in 1989. It is always announced days before the nominations are.

List of recipients

1989: Jim McKay
1990: Lindsey Nelson
1991: Curt Gowdy
1992: Chris Schenkel
1993: Pat Summerall
1994: Howard Cosell
1995: Vin Scully
1996: Frank Gifford
1997: Jim Simpson
1998: Keith Jackson
1999: Jack Buck
2000: Dick Enberg
2001: Herb Granath
2002: Roone Arledge
2003: Ed Sabol and Steve Sabol
2004: Chet Simmons
2005: Bud Greenspan
2006: Don Ohlmeyer
2007: Frank Chirkinian
2008: Dick Ebersol
2009: John Madden
2010: Al Michaels
2011: Jack Whitaker
2012: Not awarded
2013: Ted Turner
2014: George Bodenheimer
2015: Verne Lundquist
2016: Brent Musburger
2017: Barry Frank 
2018: Not awarded
2019: Dick Vitale
2020: Lesley Visser

References

Sports Emmy Awards
Lifetime achievement awards
Awards established in 1989